I Came to Party is the fifth single by former Hollywood Undead rapper Deuce, it features Travie McCoy and longtime collaborator Truth. The original version of the single is used on Deuce's first solo studio debut album Nine Lives, which was released on September 4, 2012. The single also includes "Rock Mix" version of the song through iTunes on the same day.

Rock Mix and Release
Deuce had announced a "Rock Mix" version of "I Came to Party" on his Twitter account that if you tweet "buy" to his Twitter username "@Deuce9lives", you will have the purchase to the song. Eventually, Deuce released the song as a single to iTunes, which includes both versions of the song and two different music videos.

Music video
The video, directed by Nathan Cox, is based in an empty club in Los Angeles, which Deuce walks into. It was empty until he puts on headphones, which makes a party appear in the room. At the end of the music video, Deuce takes off the headphones and the party disappears before he walks out of the room.

Cox explains the beginning of the video for "I Came to Party", which is the latest single off Deuce’s first studio album Nine Lives. “Deuce has headphones that are magical headphones,” remarks Cox. “When he puts them on, an empty club turns into a crazy club full of people.”

The video features Deuce, Millionaires (group), and also many Deuce fans who were invited via Facebook to arrive at the scene. The video also sees Deuce wearing a new mask; the design of the mask is black base with red like tape that has the word "Danger" somewhat sprayed onto.

Track listing 
This track listing is from the official release of the single from iTunes.

Charts

References

2012 singles
Songs written by Andrew Goldstein (musician)
2012 songs
Deuce (musician) songs
Electronic rock songs
Songs written by Travie McCoy